The MV Karadeniz Powership Onur Sultan is a Liberia-flagged floating power plant, owned and operated by Karpowership. In 2016, she was sent off from the Sedef Shipyard in Tuzla, Istanbul, Turkey to Myanmar to supply electricity to the power grid. In 2018, she was commissioned to supply electricity to the power grid in Indonesia.

Cargo ship
The ship was laid down on 12 February 2001, launched on April 17i and completed on 26 July the same year. She was built as a bulk carrier by JMU TSU  Shipyard in Tsu, Mie, Japan with yard number 211.

She sailed under the name MV Lowlands Trader and Panama flag until December 2005. Renamed MV Nisshin Trader, she sailed under the Philippines flag for the Tokyo-based Nisshin Shipping Co. Ltd. On 11 November 2015, she was purchased  by the Turkish company Karpowership for US$9.3 million.

Powership
She was converted into a powership at Sedef Shipyard in Tuzla, Istanbul, and renamed MV Karadeniz Powership Onur Sultan. On 13 November 2016, the Powership sailed to Myanmar in a ceremony attended by the President Recep Tayyip Erdoğan, Prime Minister Binali Yıldırım, Minister of Transport, Maritime and Communication Ahmet Arslan and other officials. She was commissioned to supply electricity to the power grid in Myanmar. In 2018, she started supplying electricity to Indonesia.

Ship's registry
 ex-MV Nisshin Trader, Philippines-flagged, owned by Nisshin Shipping Co Ltd, Japan (2005–2015)
 ex-MV Lowlands Trader, Panama-flagged (2001–2005)

References

2001 ships
Bulk carriers
Ships built by Japan Marine United
Merchant ships of Panama
Merchant ships of the Philippines
Ships of Liberia
osman Khan
Electric power infrastructure in Myanmar
Ships built at Sedef Shipyard